Michael Craig (born 20 September 1977) is a Scottish former professional footballer, who played for Aberdeen and Montrose in the Scottish Football League.

References

External links

1977 births
Living people
Scottish footballers
Aberdeen F.C. players
Montrose F.C. players
Huntly F.C. players
Scottish Football League players
Association football defenders
Scotland under-21 international footballers
Footballers from Glasgow